Giuseppe "Pino" Dordoni (28 June 1926 – 24 October 1998) was an Italian athlete who competed mainly in the 50 kilometre race walk.

Biography
He competed for Italy at the 1952 Summer Olympics held in Helsinki, Finland, where he won the gold medal in the men's 50 kilometre walk event. In 1950 he became European champion.

Achievements

National titles
Pino Dordoni has won 26 times the individual national championship.
11 wins on 10000 metres walk (1946, 1947, 1948, 1949, 1950, 1951, 1952, 1953, 1954, 1955, 1957)
10 wins on 20 km walk (1947, 1948, 1949, 1950, 1952, 1953, 1954, 1955, 1956, 1957)
5 wins on 50 km walk (1949, 1950, 1952, 1953, 1954)

See also
 Legends of Italian sport - Walk of Fame
 FIDAL Hall of Fame
Italian Athletics Championships - Multi winners

References

External links
 

1926 births
1998 deaths
Italian male racewalkers
Olympic gold medalists for Italy
Athletes (track and field) at the 1948 Summer Olympics
Athletes (track and field) at the 1952 Summer Olympics
Athletes (track and field) at the 1956 Summer Olympics
Athletes (track and field) at the 1960 Summer Olympics
Olympic athletes of Italy
Sportspeople from Piacenza
European Athletics Championships medalists
Medalists at the 1952 Summer Olympics
Olympic gold medalists in athletics (track and field)
Mediterranean Games gold medalists for Italy
Athletes (track and field) at the 1951 Mediterranean Games
Athletes (track and field) at the 1955 Mediterranean Games
Mediterranean Games medalists in athletics
Italian Athletics Championships winners
20th-century Italian people